The department of urology is one of 21 clinical departments at The University of Virginia School of Medicine in Charlottesville, Virginia. The department of urology operates from the University of Virginia Grounds, adjacent to the historic Academical Village, and from the UVA Medical Center Fontaine Research Park, 500 Ray C. Hunt Drive. The current chair of the department of urology is Kirsten Greene, MD, MS, FACS. The department of urology of the University of Virginia has been distinguished by U.S. News & World Report  among the Best Hospitals in adult and pediatric urology.

History
Almost one hundred years after the establishment of the school of medicine by Thomas Jefferson, it became evident and necessary to detach what was then known as genito-urinary practices from the general surgery and set it up as a separate service. Dr John Henry Neff, Jr. (1887–1938), a specialist in genitourinary and rectal diseases, became the first head of what would become the department of urology.
The first examining rooms of the pioneer practice were located on the ground floor along the corridor of the Steele Wing of the school of medicine at UVA. During the initial years, the practice was substantially identified with the treatment of patients and scientific research. New procedures were developed under the supervision of Dr. Neff, who was also credited with being the first surgeon in Charlottesville to use spinal anaesthesia.
Dr. Neff, Jr. died on November 8, 1938,. His funeral was held at the University of Virginia chapel on the following day. Faculty members, headed by President John L. Newcomb, were honorary pallbearers. Burial was at the University Cemetery His former assistant, Dr. Edgar Kirby, succeeded Dr. Neff as acting chairman of urology. In 1941, Dr. Samuel A. Vest (1905–1958), was appointed associate professor of urology and director of the department of urology, filling the vacancy initially created by the death of Dr. Neff. Dr. Vest was born in Haw River, on January 21, 1905. He was a graduate of Duke University and received his medical degree from Johns Hopkins University Medical School. Dr. Vest died of a heart attack at the University of Virginia Hospital on April 6, 1958. He was succeeded in the chair by Dr. Albert J. Paquin, Jr. (1921–1967). Dr. Paquin. Jr. was born on February 22, 1921, in Prescott Arizona and died on March 13, 1967, in Charlottesville, Virginia. As a surgeon, Dr. Paquin was principally interested in the reconstructive technics used to correct congenital defects of the kidney and the bladder. He was succeeded by Jay Y. Gillenwater whom at age 34 became the youngest chairman of the urology department the same year. He was succeeded by Dr. William D. Steers in 1994. Dr. William Steers died in 2015 and was succeeded by Dr. Raymond Costabile, MD. Dr. Kirsten Greene became chair in 2019.  Dr. Raymond A. Costabile.

Past chair and emeritus faculty

Clinical and research faculty

External links
 Official Facebook page
 School of Medicine home page

References

Medicine, School of